Mad TV is an American comedy sketch television series originally inspired by Mad magazine. It originally aired on Fox from October 14, 1995 to May 16, 2009. It was later revived and returned on July 26, 2016 on The CW.

Series overview

Episodes

Season 1 (1995–96)

Season 2 (1996–97)

Season 3 (1997–98)

Season 4 (1998–99)

Season 5 (1999–2000)

Season 6 (2000–01)

Season 7 (2001–02)

Season 8 (2002–03)

Season 9 (2003–04)

Season 10 (2004–05)

Season 11 (2005–06)

Season 12 (2006–07)

Season 13 (2007–08)

Season 14 (2008–09)

Season 15 (2016)

See also
 List of Mad TV cast members

References

External links
 

Lists of American comedy television series episodes
Lists of variety television series episodes
Lists of DC Comics television series episodes
Lists of DC Comics animated television series episodes